Choanograptis dihamma is a species of moth of the family Tortricidae. It is found on Borneo.

References

Moths described in 1941
Archipini